Howard Township is one of twenty-four townships in Bates County, Missouri, and is part of the Kansas City metropolitan area within the USA.  As of the 2000 census, its population was 552.

Howard Township has the name of territorial governor Benjamin Howard.

Geography
According to the United States Census Bureau, Howard Township covers an area of 37.17 square miles (96.28 square kilometers); of this, 36.9 square miles (95.57 square kilometers, 99.26 percent) is land and 0.27 square miles (0.71 square kilometers, 0.74 percent) is water.

Cities, towns, villages
 Hume

Unincorporated towns
 Sprague at 
(This list is based on USGS data and may include former settlements.)

Adjacent townships
 Walnut Township (north)
 New Home Township (northeast)
 Osage Township (east)
 Metz Township, Vernon County (southeast)
 Henry Township, Vernon County (south)
 Sheridan Township, Linn County, Kansas (west)

School districts
 Hume R-VIII
 Rich Hill R-IV

Political districts
 Missouri's 4th congressional district
 State House District 125
 State Senate District 31

References
 United States Census Bureau 2008 TIGER/Line Shapefiles
 United States Board on Geographic Names (GNIS)
 United States National Atlas

External links
 US-Counties.com
 City-Data.com

Townships in Bates County, Missouri
Townships in Missouri